Md. Mokbul Hossain (মোঃ মকবুল হোসেন) is a Bangladesh Awami League politician and the incumbent Member of Parliament from Pabna-3.

Early life
Hossain was born on 30 June 1975. He completed his studies up to S.S.C. or grade ten.

Career
Hossain was elected to Parliament on 5 January 2014 from Pabna-3 as a Bangladesh Awami League candidate.

References

Awami League politicians
Living people
1935 births
10th Jatiya Sangsad members
11th Jatiya Sangsad members
9th Jatiya Sangsad members